3537 Jürgen, provisional designation , is a stony Eunomia asteroid from the middle region of the asteroid belt, approximately 8 kilometers in diameter. It was discovered by American astronomer Edward Bowell at Lowell's Anderson Mesa Station, Arizona, on 15 November 1982. It was named after planetary scientist Jürgen Rahe.

Orbit and classification 

Jürgen is both a member of the Eunomia and Maria family of asteroids. It orbits the Sun in the central main-belt at a distance of 2.2–3.0 AU once every 4 years and 2 months (1,520 days). Its orbit has an eccentricity of 0.16 and an inclination of 15° with respect to the ecliptic. The first precovery was taken at Crimea-Nauchnij in 1982, extending the asteroid's observation arc by just 25 days prior to its discovery.

Physical characteristics 

Jürgen is a common S-type asteroid. It has also been characterized as a rare LS-type by Pan-STARRS large-scale photometric survey.

Diameter and albedo 

According to the survey carried out by the NEOWISE mission of NASA's Wide-field Infrared Survey Explorer, the asteroid measures 7.8 and 8.3 kilometers in diameter and its surface has an albedo of 0.168 and 0.188, while the Collaborative Asteroid Lightcurve Link (CALL) assumes an albedo of 0.21 and hence calculates a larger diameter of 9.1 kilometers.

Rotation period 

A 2004-published photometric lightcurve analysis by Brazilian astronomer Alvaro Alvarez-Candal rendered a provisional rotation period of 14 hours with a brightness amplitude of 0.3 in magnitude.

Naming 

This minor planet was named after Jürgen Rahe (1939–1997), German planetary scientist, astrophysicist, and Director for Solar System Exploration at NASA's Office of Space Science. He is best known for his cometary atlases and observations using the International Ultraviolet Explorer.

Jürgen Rahe was also a principal investigator of the International Halley Watch (IHW), director of both, the astronomy department at FAU and the Dr. Remeis Observatory, and affiliated with IAU's Physical Studies of Comets, Minor Planets and Meteorites commission for many years. His diplomatic skills in international projects were beneficial to both IHW and IAU. The approved naming citation was published by the Minor Planet Center on 2 April 1988.

References

External links 
 Asteroid Lightcurve Database (LCDB), query form (info )
 Dictionary of Minor Planet Names, Google books
 Asteroids and comets rotation curves, CdR – Observatoire de Genève, Raoul Behrend
 Discovery Circumstances: Numbered Minor Planets (1)-(5000) – Minor Planet Center
 
 

003537
003537
Discoveries by Edward L. G. Bowell
Named minor planets
19821115